Michael Benjamin Matuella (born June 3, 1994) is an American professional baseball pitcher who is a free agent. He played college baseball for the Duke Blue Devils. He was drafted by the Texas Rangers in the third round of the 2015 MLB draft.

Amateur career
Born and raised in the Philadelphia metropolitan area, Matuella's family moved to Great Falls, Virginia. He attended Georgetown Preparatory School in North Bethesda, Maryland, across the Potomac River. He was lightly recruited out of high school and only received offers to play college baseball at Duke University and the University of Maryland. He chose to play for the Duke Blue Devils. 

As a freshman in 2013, he appeared in 22 games with seven starts. He had a 4–4 win–loss record with a 4.53 earned run average (ERA) and 28 strikeouts over  innings pitched. In 2013, he played collegiate summer baseball in the Cape Cod Baseball League for the Yarmouth-Dennis Red Sox. As a sophomore in 2014, Matuella started 11 games, going 1–3 with a 2.78 ERA and 69 strikeouts over  innings. After the season, he was diagnosed with spondylolysis, which caused him to not pitch during the summer or fall.

Entering his junior season, Matuella was considered one of the top prospects for the 2015 Major League Baseball draft. Prior to the season he was named a preseason All-American by Baseball America. In April it was announced that he would need Tommy John surgery, which ended his junior season. He pitched only 25 innings as a junior.

Professional career
The Texas Rangers selected Matuella in the third round, with the 78th overall selection, of the 2015 draft. He signed with the Rangers, receiving a $2 million signing bonus. Matuella did not play in 2015 due to recovery from Tommy John surgery, and his 2016 season was cut short after one game with the Spokane Indians of the Class A-Short Season Northwest League due to a sprained ligament in his right elbow. He spent the first month of the 2017 season on the disabled list, but still pitched in 21 games, posting a 4–6 record with a 4.20 ERA for the Hickory Crawdads of the Class A South Atlantic League. Matuella spent the 2018 season with the Down East Wood Ducks of the Class A-Advanced Carolina League, and struggled throughout the season, posting a 3–5 record with a 8.24 ERA in 51.1 innings in 20 games (8 starts). He was assigned back to Down East for the 2019 season, going 5–2 with a 4.04 ERA over 42.1 innings. He did not play in a game in 2020 due to the cancellation of the Minor League Baseball season because of the COVID-19 pandemic. Matuella was released by Texas on May 13, 2021.

References

External links

Duke Blue Devils bio

1994 births
Living people
People from Great Falls, Virginia
Sportspeople from Fairfax County, Virginia
Baseball players from Virginia
Baseball pitchers
Duke Blue Devils baseball players
Yarmouth–Dennis Red Sox players
Spokane Indians players
Hickory Crawdads players
Down East Wood Ducks players